USS Betty M. II (SP-623) was a United States Navy patrol vessel in commission from 1917 to 1918.

Betty M. II was built as a private motorboat of the same name by the Church Boat Company at Sibley, Michigan, in 1916. In 1917, the U.S. Navy acquired her under a free lease from her owner, Charles W. Kotcher of Detroit, Michigan, for use as a section patrol boat during World War I. She was commissioned at Detroit as USS Betty M. II (SP-623) on 4 September 1917.

Assigned to the 9th, 10th, and 11th Naval Districts – a single administrative entity created by the almagamation of the 9th Naval District, 10th Naval District, and 11th Naval District – on the Great Lakes, Betty M. II operated principally at Detroit, transporting personnel and mail. After towing the patrol boat  to the American Boat Company dock at Detroit, Betty M. II was hauled out of the water for the winter on 26 November 1917 and inactivated prior to the seasonal icing over of the Great Lakes.

Relaunched after the spring thaw on 3 May 1918, Betty M. II was assigned to the Detroit and St. Clair River Patrol on the Detroit River and St. Clair River and, soon thereafter, resumed the transportation of personnel and mail. She continued these operations through the end of World War I.

On 25 November 1918, Betty M. II was hauled out of the water for the season and decommissioned. She was returned to Kotcher on 17 March 1919.

References

Department of the Navy Naval History and Heritage Command Online Library of Selected Images: Civilian Ships: Betty M. II (American Motor Boat, 1916). Served as USS Betty M. II (SP-623) in 1917-1919
NavSource Online: Section Patrol Craft Photo Archive Betty M. II (SP 623)

Patrol vessels of the United States Navy
World War I patrol vessels of the United States
Ships built in Detroit
1916 ships
Great Lakes ships